Klinkrade is a municipality in the district of Lauenburg, in Schleswig-Holstein, Germany.

References

Municipalities in Schleswig-Holstein
Herzogtum Lauenburg